Antoine is a French given name (from the Latin Antonius meaning 'highly praise-worthy') that is a variant of Danton, Titouan, D'Anton and Antonin.

The name is used in France, Switzerland, Belgium, Canada, West Greenland, Haiti, French Guiana, Madagascar, Benin, Niger, Burkina Faso, Ivory Coast, Guinea, Senegal, Mauritania, Western Sahara, Morocco, Algeria, Tunisia, Chad, Central African Republic, Cameroon, Equatorial Guinea, Gabon, Republic of the Congo, Democratic Republic of the Congo, Burundi, and Rwanda.

It is a cognate of the masculine given name Anthony. Similar names include Antaine, Anthoine, Antoan, Antoin, Antton, Antuan, Antwain, Antwan, Antwaun, Antwoine, Antwone, Antwon and Antwuan.

Feminine forms include Antonia, Antoinette, and (more rarely) Antionette.

As a first name
Antoine Alexandre Barbier (1765–1825), a French librarian and bibliographer
Antoine Arbogast (1759–1803), a French mathematician
Antoine Arnauld (1612–1694), a French theologian, philosopher and mathematician
Antoine Ashley (1984-2012), American drag queen also known as Sahara Davenport
Antoine Audet (1846–1915), a Member of the House of Commons of Canada
Antoine, bastard of Burgundy (1421–1504), bastard son of Philip III, also known as Philip the Good
Antoine Baumé (1728–1804), a French chemist
Antoine Béchamp (1816–1908), a French biologist
Antoine Bertier (1761–1854), a French landowner and politician
Antoine Bethea (born 1984), an American football player
Antoine Bibesco (1878–1851), a Romanian prince, aristocrat, lawyer, diplomat and writer
Antoine Mac Giolla Bhrighde (1957–1984), an IRA terrorist killed by the SAS in 1984
Antoine Brooks (born 1997), American football player
Antoine Busnois (1430–1492), a French composer and poet
Antoine Caldwell (born 1986), an American football player
Antoine Carr (born 1961), a former American basketball player
Antoine Carraby (born 1967), stage name DJ Yella, member of N.W.A
Antoine Cason (born 1986), an American football player
Antoine Clamaran (born 1964), a French DJ
Antoine Coupland, (born 2003), Canadian soccer player
Antoine Depardieu/D'Coolette, a character from Sonic the Hedgehog
Antoine de Caunes (born 1953), French television presenter, actor, writer and film director
Antoine de Jussieu (1686–1758), a French botanist
Antoine de Lhoyer (1768–1852), a French virtuoso guitarist and composer 
Antoine Demarest, from the Hooley Dooleys
Antoine Dénériaz (born 1976), French alpine skier
Antoine Deparcieux (1703–1768), a French mathematician
Antoine de Saint-Exupéry,(1900–1944), French aviator and writer
Antoine Dodson,(born 1986), American interviewee turned internet celebrity
Antoine Domino (1928–2017), American singer and pianist, better known as 'Fats Domino'
Antoine Drouot (1774–1844), French officer who fought in the French Revolutionary Wars and Napoleonic Wars
Antoine Dubé (born 1947), member of the Canadian House of Commons
Antoine Dufour (born 1979), a French-Canadian acoustic guitarist
Antoine François Desrues (1744–1777), French poisoner
Antoine Étex (1808–1888), French sculptor, painter and architect
Antoine Fauchery (1823–1861), French adventurer, writer and photographer
Antoine Fuqua (born 1966), an American film director
Antoine Furetière,(1619–1688), French scholar
Antoine Galland (1646–1715), French orientalist and archaeologist
Antoine Ghanem (1943–2007), Lebanese politician
Antoine Griezmann (born 1991), French football player
Antoine Héroet (1492–1568), French poet
Antoine Izméry, (?-1993), Haitian businessman
Antoine Rizkallah Kanaan Filho (born 1974), Brazilian racing driver
Antoine Karam (French Guianan politician) (born 1950)
Antoine Karam (Lebanese politician) (born 1956)
Antoine Konrad (born 1975), a Swiss DJ
Antoine Lavoisier (1743–1794), French nobleman and chemist, known for identifying oxygen and hydrogen
Antoine Adolphe Marcelin Marbot (1781–1844), French general who fought in the Napoleonic Wars
Antoine François Marmontel (1816–1898), French pianist, teacher and musicographer
Antoine McColister (born 1988), American rapper known professionally as Ace Hood
Antoine Merriweather, a character portrayed by David Alan Grier in the In Living Color sketch "Men on Film"
Antoine Parent (1666–1716), French mathematician
Antoine Pinto (born 1991), French Muay Thai kickboxing
Antoine Pruneau (born 1989), Canadian gridiron football player
Antoine de Rochebrune (born 1964), French Roman Catholic priest
Antoine Sakr, Lebanese football player
Antoine Sibierski (born 1974), French former footballer
Antoine Sonrel (1804–1879), a French engraver, illustrator and photographer
Antoine Claire Thibaudeau (1765–1854), a French politician
Antoine Vermorel-Marques (born 1993), French politician
Antoine Walker (born 1976), American basketball player
Antoine Wesley (born 1997), American football player
Antoine Winfield (born 1977), American football player
Antoine Winfield Jr. (born 1998), American football player, son of Antoine Winfield
Antoine-Aimé Dorion (1818–1891), a French-Canadian politician and jurist
Antoine-Denis Chaudet (1763–1810), a French sculptor
Antoine-Jean Gros (1771–1835), a French female painter
Antoine-Marin Lemierre (1733–1793), a French dramatist and poet

As a family name
 Éric Antoine (born 1976), French comedy magician
 Guacolda Antoine Lazzerini (1908–2015), Chilean mathematician
 Louis-Joseph Antoine (1846–1912), Walloon religions leader, founder of Antoinism
 Louis Antoine (1888–1971), French mathematician
 André Antoine (1858–1943), French actor and director, founder of the Théâtre Libre
 Jonathan Antoine (born 1995), English classical opera singer
 Josephine Antoine (1907–1971), American coloratura soprano
Vinessa Antoine (born 1983), Canadian actress

As a mononym
 Antoine (born 1944), French musician and sailor
 Antoine de Paris (1884–1976), Polish celebrity hairdresser

See also

 Antawn Jamison
 Antjuan Tobias
 Antowain Smith
 Antwaan Randle El
 DeAntoine Beasley
 Jean-Antoine

References

French masculine given names